Art in Florence may refer to:

Florentine painting
Italian Renaissance sculpture, dominated by Florence